Manuel Marrero Cruz (born 11 July 1963) is a Cuban politician currently serving as the Prime Minister of Cuba, and the first since re-establishment of the office of Prime Minister in December 2019 after the 43-year abolition of the position dating from 1976. The last Prime Minister before the abolition of the office was Fidel Castro. Marrero is the first person to hold the position of Prime Minister of Cuba in 43 years. A member of the Communist Party of Cuba, he served as the country's long-time Minister of Tourism from 2004 until his appointment to the office of Prime Minister in December 2019. During his tenure as tourism minister, Cuban tourism witnessed massive resilience. Marrero is an architect and worked in Gaviota, the tourism arm of the Cuban military, where he also held the rank of colonel.

Prime Minister of Cuba (2019–present)

Appointment
Following the 2019 Cuban constitutional referendum, the office of Prime Minister of Cuba was reinstated for the first time since Fidel Castro last occupied it in 1976. President Miguel Díaz-Canel formally nominated Marrero to serve as Prime Minister, and his nomination as PM was unanimously ratified by 594 deputies of the National Assembly. 

The term limit for prime ministers under the new Cuban constitution is five years.

References

External links
 Twitter 
 Biography by CIDOB (in Spanish)

1963 births
Communist Party of Cuba politicians
Cuban communists
Cuban politicians
Government ministers of Cuba
Living people
Prime Ministers of Cuba
Tourism ministers of Cuba